Villa del Conte is a comune (municipality) in the Province of Padua in the Italian region Veneto, located about  northwest of Venice and about  north of Padua.

Villa del Conte borders the following municipalities: Campo San Martino, San Giorgio in Bosco, San Martino di Lupari, Santa Giustina in Colle, Tombolo.

References

External links
 www.comune.villa-del-conte.pd.it/

Cities and towns in Veneto